Lazy Branch is a stream in Jackson County in the U.S. state of Missouri. It is a tributary of the North River.

Lazy Branch was so named by W.C. Dingle, because he "thought the settlers along the stream lazy because they preferred to hunt and run horses rather than work."

See also
List of rivers of Missouri

References

Rivers of Jackson County, Missouri
Rivers of Missouri